FC Khujand,, is a Tajik professional football club based in Khujand, currently playing in the Ligai Olii Tojikiston, the top division in the country.

History
FС Khujand was established in 1976 from the remnants of the club Pomir which was previously known as Miner. The first head coach of the team was Vladimir Burin. FC Khujand competed in the Central Asian Championship B League for 15 years. FС Khujand plays its home matches in Spartak Stadium which was located in the heart of the city before moving to the 20 Years of Independence Stadium (also known as 20-Letie Nezavisimosti Stadium). The best performances of FC Khujand in this competition were 8th place in 1983 and 1986, runners-up in 1990 and a third-place finish in 1991. Since the independence of Tajikistan from USSR, FC Khujand has won the Tajik Cup on four occasions; 1998, 2002, 2008 and 2017.

On 12 April 2019, Numonjon Yusupov was sacked as the club's manager, with Sharif Ziyoyev being appointed as caretaker manager.

On 16 April 2019, Vitaliy Levchenko was appointed as the new manager of Khujand.

On 21 December 2019, Nikola Lazarevic was announced as the new head coach of FK Khujand.

On 12 July 2020, Khujand announced Khakim Fuzailov as their new manager, after Nikola Lazarevic was unable to return to Tajikistan due to travel restrictions imposed by the COVID-19 pandemic, with Rustam Khojayev previously being in temporary charge since the Ligai Olii Tojikiston returned on 16 June 2020.

On 10 September 2020, the 2020 AFC Cup was cancelled.

Domestic history

Continental history

Honours
Tajik Cup
Winners (5): 1998, 2002, 2008, 2017, 2021

Sponsorship
On 28 March 2019, Khujand announced a sponsorship deal with Thai energy drink company Carabao.

On 26 October 2019, Samsung became the first title sponsor of Khujand with their Samsung UHD TV brand until the end of the 2020 season.

On 15 January 2021, Khujand announced that betting company "Formula 55" had replaced Samsung as their title sponsor.

Current squad
''

References

Khujand
1976 establishments in Tajikistan